Galletas pesquera, often simply called galletas or galyetas, are Filipino biscuits. They are characteristically very thin and disc-shaped, usually with three or more small perforations. They are popular in Tagalog and Ilonggo regions.

See also
Broas
Galletas de patatas
Galletas del Carmen
Roscas

References 

Philippine pastries
Biscuits